Borkum West can refer to
 Alpha Ventus Offshore Wind Farm, also known as Borkum West
 Borkum West II wind farm